Bibliotheca universalis (1545–49) was the first truly comprehensive "universal" listing of all the books of the first century of printing. It was an alphabetical bibliography that listed all the known books printed in Latin, Greek, or Hebrew.

Bibliotheca (1545) 

The Swiss scholar Conrad Gessner started to compile his extensive work on Bibliotheca universalis at the age of 25. He first visited as many of the Italian and German libraries as he could find. His motivation was partly a fear of the loss of precious manuscripts, such as the destruction of the library at Buda, by the Turks in 1526. He described the project in its title, as involving works "extant and not, ancient and more recent down to the present day, learned and not, published and hiding in libraries". He published the completed work in 1545 in Zurich, after some four years of research. At the time, he wrote "In truth I rejoice and thank God because I have finally gotten out of the labyrinth in which I was trapped for almost three years". It included his own bio-bibliography. Bibliotheca universalis was the first modern bibliography of importance published since the invention of printing, and through it, Gessner became known as the "father of bibliography."

The work attempted to be an exhaustive survey of known writing in Latin, Greek, and Hebrew, and included approximately three thousand authors  The authors’ forenames were listed alphabetically according to mediaeval usage, with a reverse index of their surnames. It was intended as an index by subject of all known authors. Gessner listed the writers together with the titles of their works, short biographies, and publication details including place of printing, printers and editors. He added his own annotations, comments, and evaluations of the nature and merit of every entry. It included about twelve thousand titles.

Gessner followed Johannes Trithemius’s work of placing works in systems of cataloging. Gessner admired Trithemius’s systems and used them as guidelines and templates; however Gessner carried the idea of cataloging and systems a step further. Theodore Besterman, in The Beginnings of Systematic Bibliography,   suggests that Gessner’s work to organize knowledge was the forerunner of Francis Bacon’s works and other encyclopedias that followed. Though called "universal", it was intended to be selective.

Pandectae (1548) 

In 1548, Gessner followed this with a companion thematic index to Bibliotheca universalis, a large folio, Pandectarum sive Partitionum universalium Conradi Gesneri Tigurini, medici & philosophiae professoris, libri xxi (Pandectae).
 This contained thirty thousand topical entries. Each of these entries were cross-referenced to the appropriate author and book, arranged under headings and sub-headings, which were associated with various branches of learning.

The Pandectae had nineteen sections, each devoted to a scholarly discipline and contained dedications to the best scholar printers of Gessner's time. He listed their publications and accomplishments. The planned scope of 21 books was never completed, since part 20 De re medica was never published, and part 21 De theologia Christiana was published separately as Partitiones theologicae in 1549. A further supplement Appendix bibliothecae containing additions previously published separately by Lycosthenes (1551) and Simmler (1555) appeared in 1555.

Gessner made full use of any publishers' catalogues and booksellers' lists which were available in the 16th century that were printed when he was doing his research. These included use of printed catalogues supplied by firms like Aldus Manutius of Venice and Henri Estienne of Paris.

Bibliotheca selecta (1593) 

Gessner's work, with its heterodox principles and advanced Protestant scholarship was a direct challenge to the authority of the Catholic Church which soon banned the work in the Index librorum prohibitorum. The Counter Reformation's response took another generation of Catholic scholarship to produce and appeared on the Vatican press in Rome in 1593 under the programmatic title, Bibliotheca selecta. This updated "Anti-Gessner" was assembled in 18 books covering the bibliography of the traditional scientific disciplines (Theology, 1-11, Law, 12, Philosophy, 13, Medicine, 14) and the liberal arts, 15–18, by the Mantuan Jesuit humanist and bibliographer Antonio Possevino.

Notes

References

Bibliography

 
 
 
 
 
 
 
 
 
 

German books
15th-century literature
16th-century literature
1545 books
Published bibliographies
Incunabula
Early Modern literature